Riku Immonen is a retired Finnish professional Muay Thai kickboxer and active muay thai coach. He is an amateur and professional Muay Thai World Champion. He trains fighters out of Turku Muay Thai. Most well known students are UFC fighter Makwan Amirkhani, Topi Helin and Daniel Forsberg. He trains also UFC fighter Teemu Packalen.

Martial arts
Immonen trained Wrestling 6 months as a child around age of 12, but continued to play volleyball instead of wrestling. Started Muay Thai at age of 18 and stopped fighting at age of 25. He has been coaching since. Made short comeback in 2014 at age of 40 to fight singer Daniel Landa.

Author
Riku Immonen has published two books in Finnish. Short humorous stories of "Adventures of Harley-Davidson man" at motorcycle forum moottoripyora.org became popular and Immonen decided to publish his first book "HD-miehen seikkailut" in 2008. It sold 10 000 copies and the second book "HD-mies ja löydetyn respektin menetys" in 2009 sold 5000 copies. First book has been translated to Estonian language. Immonen has also written articles for print magazines Fighter Magazine and FightSport.

Titles

Professional
1999 WMC World Champion (160lbs)

Amateur
2001 Finland Boxing Championships  -81 kg
1999 I.A.M.T.F. World Muay Thai World Championships in Bangkok, Thailand  -71 kg
1998 I.F.M.A. King's Cup World Championships in Samut Prakan, Thailand  -71 kg
1998 I.A.M.T.F. European Muay Thai Championships in Calafell, Spain  -71 kg
1998 M.T.A.F. Finland Muay Thai Championships in Helsinki, Finland  -71 kg

Awards
1999 Fighter of the Year - Trophy. Muay Thai Association of Finland.
1999 Tournament 2nd Best Fighter - Award. I.A.M.T.F. World Muay Thai World Championships in Bangkok, Thailand.
1998 Tournament Most Technical Fighter - Trophy. I.A.M.T.F. European Muay Thai Championships in Calafell, Spain.

Muay thai record

See also
List of male kickboxers

References 

 Fight record http://www.muaythai.fi/?page_id=762&fighter_name=riku-immonen
 http://www.iltasanomat.fi/muutlajit/art-2000000868501.html
 http://www.mtv.fi/viihde/seurapiirit/artikkeli/ufc-tahti-makwan-amirkhani-avautuu-kirjassa-suomi-on-pelastanut-mun-hengen/5498806
 http://yle.fi/urheilu/3-7692194
 http://www.iltalehti.fi/kamppailulajit/2016030121197986_bw.shtml
 https://rizk.com/en/casino/promotions/makwan-amirkhani-documentary/3498

Sources
 Suomalaiset kamppailulajien tekijät, Tero Laaksonen, 
 Muay Thai record at MTAF
 Adventures of Harley-Davidson man at Moottoripyora.org

External links
 Turku Muay Thai
 Riku Immonen facebook

1974 births
Living people
People from Joensuu
Finnish Muay Thai practitioners
Finnish male kickboxers
Muay Thai trainers
Sportspeople from North Karelia